Jan Kotouč (born 1987) is a Czech military science fiction and space opera author. He is the author of several science fiction books and creator of Hirano Sector universe.

Early life
Kotouč graduated from University of New York in Prague/La Salle University in 2013, with a master's degree in Mass Media and Communication.

Writing career
Kotouč began writing short fan fiction stories taking place in the Star Wars universe, which he published on a Czech fan fiction website Jediland. He eventually began to write stories from his own created universe, Hirano Sector, a place on the verge of large scale inter-planetary conflict. In 2008 his novella from Hirano universe, Příliš blízké setkání (Eng: Too Close Encounter) won the Czech Cena Karla Čapka award in its category. It was subsequently published in Mlok anthology and in 2010 as a novel.

His first published novel was Pokračování diplomacie (2009; Eng: Continuation of Diplomacy). In 2012, his two-volume novel, Tristanská občanská válka (Eng: Tristan Civil War) was voted Book of the Year at the Aeronautilus Awards. The same year, Kotouč received an Encouragement Award from the European Science Fiction Society.

Published works
Source: Legie

Sektor Hirano series
 Příliš blízké setkání (2008), novella published in Mlok anthology, rewritten and published as a novel in 2010; in English as Too close an encounter (2019)
 Pokračování diplomacie (2009)
 Tristanská občanská válka (2011), two volumes
 Volání do zbraně (2012)
 Na prahu očistce (2014)
 Bitva o Sinaj (2015)
 Simeral v plamenech (2016)
 Cíl: Kasimir (2017)

České země series
 Nad českými zeměmi slunce nezapadá (2016)
 Ofenziva českých zemí (2017)
 V tajné službě Koruny české (2019)
 Spojenci českých zemí (2020)

Agent John Francis Kovář series
This series was created by Miroslav Žamboch and Jiří Walker Procházka with books also written by other Czech authors.

 Invaze (2013), Agent John Francis Kovář volume 31

Central Imperium series
 Hranice Impéria (2019), in English as Frontiers of the Imperium (2019)
 Císař v exilu (2019), in English as Emperor in exile (2020)

Other works
 Malá apokalypsa, Pevnost magazine 2011/10
 Nová éra, Pevnost magazine 2012/02
 Válečné hry, in Zpěv kovových velryb (2014), in English as War Games in Dreams from Beyond (2016)
 Velitelské rozhodnutí, XB-1 magazine 2013/07
 Bez iluzí, in Soumrak světů (2014), Agent John Francis Kovář volume 33
 Ex Luna, Annihilatio, in Capricorn 70 (2015)
 Zpátky do služby, part of e-book release Volání do zbraně (2015)
 Návrat na Tristan, part of e-book release Na prahu očistce (2015)
 Argentinské probuzení, in Ve stínu Říše (2017)
 Cena za službu, in Space opera 2018 (2018)
 Po Velké bouři, in Ve stínu apokalypsy (2018)
 Hippocratic Oath, in From the Ashes: Stories from The Fallen World (2019), in English only

References

External links

 Official website, retrieved 6 August 2019.
 Daňková, Magdaléna, "Sci-fi autor: Lidi mi píšou, ať nechám zabít jejich učitele", Aktualne.cz, 20 August 2014, retrieved 28 November 2014.

1987 births
Czech male writers
Living people
Writers from Prague